Pierre Ragues (born 10 January 1984 in Caen) is a French racing driver, who competes in the FIA World Endurance Championship.

Career

Karting
Debuting in karting in 1994, Ragues was second in the Monaco Kart Cup in Formula A in 2001, and third in the French Elite Championship. Since starting to race cars, Ragues has continued to compete in karts.

Single-seaters
Ragues started racing cars in 2003 when he took part in Formula Renault Campus in France, finishing runner-up to dominant champion Laurent Groppi and scoring one race win. He also took part in the 2003 Spa 24 Hours in a Paul Belmondo Racing-run Chrysler Viper GTS-R. For the following years he raced in French Formula Renault, finishing 12th and 15th overall in the two seasons.

After racing sportscars in 2006, Ragues took part in International Formula Master in 2007, finishing 14th overall with one podium finish.

Sportscars
In 2006 Ragues started in sports car racing, contesting the LMP2 class of the Le Mans Series and 24 Hours of Le Mans for Paul Belmondo Racing. After his brief return to single-seaters, in 2008 he raced for Saulnier Racing and finished fifth in the Le Mans Series LMP2 drivers' standings and third in class at Le Mans.

2009 saw him start his relationship with the Signature team. They finished 11th overall and tenth in LMP1 at the 2009 24 Hours of Le Mans and seventh in the Le Mans Series. Signature switched to a Lola-Aston Martin B09/60 for 2010, and the team finished second in the LMS teams' championship with their drivers in fourth place.

In 2011 Ragues switched back to the Saulnier team, now operating as OAK Racing, before returning to Signature in 2012, now racing as Signatech-Nissan. He finished tenth overall and fourth in LMP2 at the 2012 24 Hours of Le Mans.

Racing record

Complete 24 Hours of Le Mans results

Complete FIA World Endurance Championship results

* Season still in progress. 
† There was no drivers championship that year, the result indicates rank in the LMP2 Trophy.

References

External links
 
 

1984 births
Living people
Sportspeople from Caen
French racing drivers
FIA GT Championship drivers
European Le Mans Series drivers
American Le Mans Series drivers
24 Hours of Le Mans drivers
French Formula Renault 2.0 drivers
French F4 Championship drivers
International Formula Master drivers
FIA World Endurance Championship drivers
World Rally Championship drivers
Karting World Championship drivers
Signature Team drivers
OAK Racing drivers
Larbre Compétition drivers
Morand Racing drivers
Euronova Racing drivers
AF Corse drivers